The 1929 Washington and Lee Generals football team was an American football team that represented Washington and Lee University during the 1929 college football season as a member of the Southern Conference. In their first year under head coach Eugene Oberst, the team compiled an overall record of 3–5–1, with a mark of 1–4–1 in conference play, finishing in 18th place in the SoCon.

Schedule

References

Washington and Lee
Washington and Lee Generals football seasons
Washington and Lee Generals football